Vincenzo Bertolotto (24 April 1912 in Turin – 4 April 1992 in Turin) was an Italian commercial lawyer and rugby union and professional rugby league footballer who played in the 1930s, 1940s and 1950s. He is also the father of the architect Carlo Bertolotto.

Playing career

International honours

Rugby union
Vincenzo Bertolotto won caps for Italy (RU) in the 1936 FIRA Tournament against Germany and Romania, in 1937 against Germany and Romania, in 1942 against Romania, and was captain in 1948 against France XV.

Rugby league
Vincenzo Bertolotto co-organised (with Dennis Chappell , from Wakefield, and a Turin resident), and captained the Italy (RL) tour of 1950 to France (3 matches), England and Wales, including; 28-49 defeat by Wigan at Central Park, Wigan on Saturday 26 August 1950, Huddersfield at Fartown Ground, Huddersfield on Wednesday 6 September 1950, 11-29 defeat by South Wales XIII at Brewery Field, Bridgend on Saturday 2 September 1950, and 38-74 defeat by St. Helens at Knowsley Road on Thursday 16 November 1950.

The Italy (RL) squad was; Guido Aleati (previously of R.S. Ginnastica Torino (RU)), Sergio Aleati (previously of R.S. Ginnastica Torino (RU)), Roberto Antonioli (previously of R.S. Ginnastica Torino (RU)), Angelo Arrigoni (previously of R.S. Ginnastica Torino (RU)), Vincenzo Bertolotto (previously of R.S. Ginnastica Torino (RU)), Michele Bietto, Giovanni Bonino (previously of R.S. Ginnastica Torino (RU)), Luigi Bosia, Giuseppe Cannone, Pasquale Cannone, Delio Caron, Gabriele Casalegno (previously of R.S. Ginnastica Torino (RU)), Amerio Chiara, Giorgio Cornacchia, Guido Cornarino (previously of R.S. Ginnastica Torino (RU)), Fabrizio Faglioli, Enzo Francesconi, Giuseppe Franco, Aldo Guglielminotti (previously of R.S. Ginnastica Torino (RU)), Giovanni Orecchia, Luigi Pignattaro, Franco Pipino, Giorgio Rassaval, Giorgio Rubino, Giovanni Tamagno (previously of R.S. Ginnastica Torino (RU)), Oreste Tescari and Giovanni Vigna.

Italy (RL) toured again in 1954, they were known as Federazione Amatori Italiani – Gioco di XIII (Federation of Italian Amateurs - Game of thirteen) because they were prevented from using the term "rugby" by the Federazione Italiana Rugby (Italian Rugby (Union) Federation), the squad included; Baldassin ( for Carpentras XIII who attempted goals without a run up), Vincenzo Bertolotto, and Giovanni Vigna, the squad arrived in Leeds on Tuesday 6 April 1954, to play six games in fifteen days, Giovanni Vigna scored 3-tries, and Baldassin scored 3-goals from eleven attempts in the initial 18-67 defeat by Bradford Northern at Odsal Stadium, Bradford in front of a crowd of 7,000 under Floodlights in the evening on Wednesday 7 April 1954, the Bradford Northern team was; Joe Phillips, David Knorpf, Joseph Mageen, Emlyn Jenkins, William "Bill" Seddon, Jack McLean, Leonard Haley, (Peter?) P. Goddard, (Griff?) G. Jones, (Norman?) N. Carter, Norman Haley, Wynn Jones, Trevor Foster, Anthony/Antony "Tony" Story, Brian Radford, Ken Traill, the initial match was originally scheduled to be an amateur international at Odsal Stadium, Bradford, this was rescheduled to later in the tour at Central Park, Wigan, and Bradford Northern agreed to play despite only having played Halifax on Monday 5 April 1954.

Club career

Rugby union
Vincenzo Bertolotto was the captain of the R.S. Ginnastica Torino (RU) team that won the 1947 Campionati italiani. In honour of this, Bertolotto's name appears alongside his teammates on a plaque affixed to Motovelodromo Fausto Coppi in Turin, the squad was; eight players that would subsequently accompany Bertolotto on the 1950 rugby league tour, and also Ausonio Alacevich, Bianco, Campi, Chiosso, Chiosso, Mario Dotti IV, Pescarmona, Piovano, Rocca, Felice Rama (coach), Siliquini, and Sandro Vigliano.

Rugby league
Following the Italy (RL) tour of 1950 to France, England, and Wales, a Torino XIII featuring Vincenzo Bertolotto joined the French league.

References

Benedetto Pasqua; Mirio Da Roit, Cent'anni di rugby a Torino (One Hundred Years of Rugby in Turin), Torino, Ananke [2011].
Francesco Volpe; Paolo Pacetti, Rugby 2012, Roma, Zesi [2011].
Gianluca Barca; Gian Franco Bellè, La Sesta Nazione (The Sixth Nation), Parma, Grafiche Step [2008].

External links

Search for "Bertolotto" at rugbyleagueproject.org

1912 births
1992 deaths
Italian rugby league players
Italian rugby union players
Italy international rugby union players
Italy national rugby league team captains
Italy national rugby league team players
Sportspeople from Turin
Rugby league second-rows
Rugby union flankers
Rugby union locks
Torino XIII captains
Torino XIII players